Eldin Dzogovic (born 8 June 2003) is a Luxembourgish footballer who plays as a defender for German club 1. FC Magdeburg and the Luxembourg national team.

Career
As a youth academy player of 1. FC Magdeburg, Dzogovic received maiden call-up to Luxembourg senior team in March 2021. He made his senior debut on 24 March 2021 in a 0–1 friendly defeat against Qatar.

Career statistics

International

References

External links
 

2003 births
Living people
Association football defenders
Luxembourgian footballers
Luxembourg international footballers
Luxembourg youth international footballers
Luxembourgian expatriate footballers
Luxembourgian expatriate sportspeople in Germany
Expatriate footballers in Germany